The scleraxis protein is a member of the basic helix-loop-helix (bHLH) superfamily of transcription factors.  Currently two genes ( and  respectively) have been identified to code for identical scleraxis proteins.

Function 
It is thought that early scleraxis-expressing progenitor cells lead to the eventual formation of tendon tissue and other muscle attachments.  Scleraxis is involved in mesoderm formation and is expressed in the syndetome (a collection of embryonic tissue that develops into tendon and blood vessels) of developing somites (primitive segments or compartments of embryos).

Inducing scleraxis expression 
The syndetome location within the somite is determined by FGF secreted from the center of the myotome (a collection of embryonic tissue that develops into skeletal muscle)- the FGF then induces the adjacent anterior and posterior sclerotome (a collection of embryonic tissue that develops into the axial skeleton) to adopt a tendon cell fate. This ultimately places future scleraxis-expressing cells between the two tissue types they will ultimately join. 

Scleraxis expression will be seen throughout the entire sclerotome (rather than just the sclerotome directly anterior and posterior to the myotome) with an overexpression of FGF8, demonstrating that all sclerotome cells are capable of expressing scleraxis in response to FGF signaling. While the FGF interaction has been shown to be necessary for scleraxis expression, it is still unclear as to whether the FGF signaling pathway directly induces the syndetome to secrete scleraxis, or indirectly through a secondary signaling pathway. Most likely, the syndetomal cells, through careful reading of the FGF concentration (coming from the myotome), can precisely determine their location and begin expressing scleraxis. Much of embryonic development follows this model of inducing specific cell fates through the reading of surrounding signaling molecule concentration gradients.

Background 
bHLH transcription factors have been shown to have a wide array of functions in developmental processes. More precisely, they have critical roles in the control of cellular differentiation, proliferation and regulation of oncogenesis. To date, 242 eukaryotic proteins belonging to the HLH superfamily have been reported. They have varied expression patterns in all eukaryotes from yeast to humans.

Structurally, bHLH proteins are characterised by a “highly conserved domain containing a stretch of basic amino acids adjacent to two amphipathic α-helices separated by a loop”.

These helices have important functional properties, forming part of the DNA binding and transcription activating domains. With respect to scleraxis, the bHLH region spans amino acid residues 78 to 131.  A proline rich region is also predicted to lie between residues 161–170. A stretch of basic residues, which aids in DNA binding, is found closer to the N terminal end of scleraxis.

HLH proteins that lack this basic domain have been shown to negatively regulate the activities of bHLH proteins and are called inhibitors of differentiation (Id). Basic HLH proteins function normally as dimers and bind to a specific hexanucleotide DNA sequence (CAANTG) known as an E-box thus switching on the expression of various genes involved in cellular development and survival.

References 

Genetics
Gene expression
Transcription factors